Marmara is a genus of moths in the family Gracillariidae.

The head is smooth, antennae four-fifths to one, basal joint thick, with slight pecten. Labial palpi moderately long, porrected, slender, with appressed scales, pointed. Maxillary palpi 3 absent, 4 absent, 6 absent, 8 absent, 11 absent. Hindwings about one-half, linear-canceolate,  cilia: 3 absent, 4 absent, 5 and 6 stalked.

Correlated to Lithocolletis, but distinguished by the smooth head.
Imago in repose sitting with forepart somewhat raised.

Species
Marmara affirmata (Meyrick, 1918)
Marmara apocynella Braun, 1915
Marmara arbutiella Busck, 1904
Marmara auratella Braun, 1915
Marmara basidendroca Fitzgerald, 1973
Marmara corticola Fitzgerald, 1973
Marmara elotella (Busck, 1909)
Marmara fasciella (Chambers, 1875)
Marmara fraxinicola Braun, 1922
Marmara fulgidella (Clemens, 1860)
Marmara guilandinella Busck, 1900
Marmara gulosa Guillén & Davis, 2001
Marmara habecki D.R. Davis, 2011
Marmara ischnotoma (Meyrick, 1915)
Marmara isortha (Meyrick, 1915)
Marmara leptodesma Meyrick, 1928
Marmara opuntiella Busck, 1907
Marmara oregonensis Fitzgerald, 1975
Marmara phaneropis (Meyrick, 1915)
Marmara pomonella Busck, 1915
Marmara salictella Clemens, 1863
Marmara serotinella Busck, 1915
Marmara smilacisella (Chambers, 1875)

References

External links
Global Taxonomic Database of Gracillariidae (Lepidoptera)

Marmarinae
Gracillarioidea genera